These are the results of the men's floor competition, one of eight events for male competitors in artistic gymnastics at the 1992 Summer Olympics in Barcelona.  The qualification and final rounds took place on July 27, 29 and August 2 at the Palau d'Esports de Barcelona.

Results

Qualification

Eighty-nine gymnasts competed in the floor event during the compulsory and optional rounds on July 27 and 29.  The eight highest scoring gymnasts advanced to the final on August 2.  Each country was limited to two competitors in the final.

Final

References
Official Olympic Report
www.gymnasticsresults.com

Men's floor
Men's events at the 1992 Summer Olympics